Louis Dugauguez (21 February 1918 – 22 September 1991) was a French football player and football manager.

Playing career

Coaching career
He managed Sedan and led the team to success in Coupe de France twice, in 1956 and 1961. In 1967, he became France national team manager, but his stint was short and unsuccessful.

CS Sedan Ardennes's stadium is named after him.

References

External links
 

1918 births
1991 deaths
Association football midfielders
French footballers
French football managers
RC Lens players
CS Sedan Ardennes players
CS Sedan Ardennes managers
France national football team managers
Sportspeople from Charente-Maritime
Footballers from Nouvelle-Aquitaine